Ronald G. Cameron (September 10, 1917 - September 14, 2004) served in the California State Senate representing the 7th District from 1959 to 1963. During World War II he served in the United States Army. Cameron was born in Canada.

References

United States Army personnel of World War II
Democratic Party California state senators
20th-century American politicians
1917 births
2004 deaths
Canadian emigrants to the United States